Michal Snunit (born 1940) is an Israeli journalist, magazine editor, poet and author of books for children.

Biography 
Michal Lerner (later Snunit) was born in Kibbutz Ein Hahoresh, which her Belgian-born parents helped to found. She studied Hebrew literature and theater at Tel Aviv University. 
She is married to Zvi Elpeleg.

Literary career 
From 1975 to 1979, Snunit was the editor of a weekly magazine. In addition to her books for young readers, she has published articles on children's literature and written lyrics for children's musicals.

The Soul Bird is a poetic story for children about the relationship between ourselves and our soul. It has sold 400,000 copies in Israel and has been translated into over 25 languages. Its appeal is similar to that of St Exupéry's The Little Prince, using the simple language of childhood to convey a deeper philosophical message.

She is a 2005 recipient of the Prime Minister's Prize for Hebrew Literary Works.

See also

Hebrew literature

References

External links
 Michal Snunit at ITHL (Institute for the Translation of Hebrew Literature)
 Homepage about the book in English, German and Upper-Sorbian language

Israeli children's writers
Living people
Israeli women children's writers
Tel Aviv University alumni
Recipients of Prime Minister's Prize for Hebrew Literary Works
1940 births